Patricio Jara Álvarez (born 4 May 1974) is a Chilean writer and journalist.

Biography 
Patricio Jara grew up in Antofagasta and studied at the Jesuit Colegio San Luis, where he wrote his first stories.

Later he entered , where he qualified as a journalist in 1996. In his time as a university student he won his first prizes.

His articles have appeared in various media such as the Revista de Libros and Sábado (both of El Mercurio), Qué Pasa, and The Clinic. An extreme rock fan, he has published chronicles in Rolling Stone and written a kind of personal history of national metal music, as well as a biography of the Chilean death/thrash metal band Pentagram.

Since 2004 he has lived in Santiago, in the neighborhood of Ñuñoa, near the National Stadium, where he attends football matches. His love for this sport has been reflected in "Marihuana Álvarez", which was part of Gente que va al estadio (1997, with a foreword by Hernán Rivera Letelier), a book that also includes stories by two other journalists. In addition to teaching at UDP, he is an editor for Ediciones B. He is married and has two daughters.

Literary career 
The first book published by Jara was a compilation of his stories, Última ronda, which appeared in Antofagasta in 1996. Although he has continued to work in the short fiction genre, it is with his novels that he has achieved notoriety. In the first of these, he did not go far from the story, because it was a short novel destined for the youth audience, Ave satani (1999), which, reissued by Alfaguara in 2004, became De aquí se ve tu casa, and which reflects Jara's love for heavy metal.

His consecration in Chile came in 2002, when he won the award of the National Book and Reading Council for best unpublished novel of the year with El sangrado. It was at that time that the magazine Qué Pasa included him, together with Marcelo Simonetti and Alejandro Cabrera, in "the trio of the country's literary renewal", and Hernán Rivera Letelier wrote about Jara: "He always showed himself to be a literary animal. He eats, dreams, and fornicates literature. I see him as the leader of the nortina squad, holding strong in Santiago." His subsequent novels include, Prat (a fictional story of the naval hero Arturo Prat), Quemar un pueblo (2009), and Geología de un planeta desierto (2013).

The latter, praised by critics, contains autobiographical material of the relationship with his father (who died in 1998, "after a hard decade of alcoholism"), which was reflected in the evolution of the title. Jara called it first Géologo, then Novela de papá, and finally Geología... As for the influences on this work, he recognizes that of Michel Houellebecq, an author who "appears as a character at the end of the novel."

Jara's writing process is usually long, and sometimes takes years from the idea for a novel until the final version. In 2009, the year in which three of his books appeared, he explained in an interview: "I had thought of Prat since 2004 and I wrote it in 2008. I have been working on the stories in Las zapatillas... since 1994, back in my university days. And I began writing parts of Quemar un pueblo in 2005, when I was still living in Antofagasta."

Awards and recognitions 
 First prize at the Story Contest for Writers of the Northern Zone (1995, 1996, and 2001)
 First prize in the Dándole Genre Story contest (1995)
 Literary Creation Fellowship of the National Book Council
 Second place in the Pedro de Oña contest for his novella La elasticidad de los cuerpos, written thanks to a fellowship from the previous year
 Finalist of the Paula Story Contest
 2002 Award of the National Book and Reading Council for best unpublished novel, for El sangrador
 Selected one of the leaders of 2002 (culture area) by El Mercurios magazine Sábado in conjunction with Adolfo Ibáñez University
 2014 Santiago Municipal Literature Award, novel category, for Geología de un planeta desierto

Works 
 Última ronda, stories, Universidad José Santos Ossa Press, Antofagasta, 1996 
 Ave satani, young adult novella, Santos Ossa, Antofagasta, 1999; reissued as De aquí se ve tu casa, Alfaguara, Santiago, 2004
 Derivas, stories, La Uña Rota, España, 2000
 El sangrador, novel, Alfaguara, Santiago, 2002
 El mar enterrado, Seix Barral, Santiago, 2005
 El exceso, Alfaguara, Santiago, 2007
 Prat, Bruguera, 2009
 Las zapatillas de Drácula, young adult literature, Grupo Editorial Norma, 2009
 Quemar un pueblo, novel, Alfaguara, 2009
 Pájaros negros, chronicles of Chilean heavy metal, Ediciones B, 2012 
 Geología de un planeta desierto, novel, Alfaguara, 2013
 Pentagram, biography of the Chilean band of the same name; bilingual edition together with a double disc, Germany, 2013
 Pájaros negros 2, more chronicles of Chilean heavy metal, Ediciones B, 2014 
 El libro de Los Tenores y las historias de La Banda, Ediciones Lolita, Santiago, 2015
 Antipop, novel, Alfaguara, 2016
 Read in Blood 1986-2016: 30 años del clásico de Slayer, essay, Planeta, 2016
 Dios nos odia a todos, Emecé, Santiago, 2017
 El cielo rojo del norte, short stories, Alfaguara, Santiago, 2018 
 Tragar el sol, Alfaguara, Santiago, 2020

Theater
 Pacífico, Theater Company of the University of Antofagasta, coauthor and director: Alberto Olguín, 2004 
 Q. Un quijote urbano, Theater Company of the University of Antofagasta, coauthor and director: Alberto Olguín, 2005

References

External links 
 

1974 births
21st-century Chilean novelists
21st-century Chilean male writers
Chilean journalists
Chilean male novelists
Chilean male short story writers
Academic staff of Diego Portales University
Academic staff of the University of Chile
Living people
People from Antofagasta
Chilean male dramatists and playwrights
21st-century Chilean dramatists and playwrights
20th-century Chilean short story writers
21st-century Chilean short story writers
20th-century Chilean male writers